Zawady Małe  is a settlement, part of the village of Stare Jabłonki in the administrative district of Gmina Ostróda, within Ostróda County, Warmian-Masurian Voivodeship, in northern Poland.

During World War II, the settlement was the site of a massacre of 110 Poles and 7 Russians, committed by the Germans on January 21–22, 1945. There is a memorial at the site.

References

External links 

 

Villages in Ostróda County
Nazi war crimes in Poland